13th Anniversary Show was the 13th ROH Anniversary Show professional wrestling pay-per-view event produced by Ring of Honor (ROH), which took place on March 1, 2015 at The Orleans, a hotel and casino in the Las Vegas-area community of Paradise, Nevada. This event was the third live pay-per-view for ROH.

Storylines
This professional wrestling event featured nine professional wrestling matches, which involved different wrestlers from pre-existing scripted feuds, plots, and storylines that played out on ROH's television programs. Wrestlers portrayed villains or heroes as they followed a series of events that built tension and culminated in a wrestling match or series of matches.

The card also featured wrestlers from ROH's international partner New Japan Pro-Wrestling, with which they have a talent exchange agreement.

Former ROH wrestler and ROH World Champion Samoa Joe made his return to the promotion during the pay-per-view event.

Ray Rowe returned from his injury doing a run-in during the main event.

Results

Footnotes

References

Ring of Honor pay-per-view events
Professional wrestling in the Las Vegas Valley
2015 in Nevada
Events in Paradise, Nevada
13
March 2015 events in the United States
2015 Ring of Honor pay-per-view events